Acipenser is a genus of sturgeons. With 17 living species (others are only known from fossil remains), it is the largest genus in the order Acipenseriformes. The genus is paraphyletic, containing all sturgeons that do not belong to Huso, Scaphirhynchus, or Pseudoscaphirhynchus, with many species more closely related to the other three genera than they are to other species of Acipenser. They are native to freshwater and estuarine systems of Eurasia and North America, and most species are threatened.  Several species also known to enter near-shore marine environments in the Atlantic, Arctic and Pacific oceans.

Living species
There are 17 living species:

Acipenser baerii J. F. Brandt, 1869
Acipenser baerii baerii J. F. Brandt, 1869 (Siberian sturgeon)
Acipenser baerii baicalensis A. M. Nikolskii, 1896 (Baikal sturgeon)
Acipenser baerii stenorrhynchus A. M. Nikolskii, 1896
Acipenser brevirostrum Lesueur, 1818 (Shortnose sturgeon)
Acipenser dabryanus A. H. A. Duméril, 1869 (Yangtze sturgeon)
Acipenser fulvescens Rafinesque, 1817 (Lake sturgeon)
Acipenser gueldenstaedtii J. F. Brandt & Ratzeburg, 1833 (Russian sturgeon)
Acipenser medirostris Ayres, 1854 (Green sturgeon)
Acipenser mikadoi Hilgendorf, 1892 (Sakhalin sturgeon)
Acipenser naccarii Bonaparte, 1836 (Adriatic sturgeon)
Acipenser nudiventris Lovetsky, 1828 (Fringebarbel sturgeon)
Acipenser oxyrinchus Mitchill, 1815
Acipenser oxyrinchus desotoi Vladykov, 1955 (Gulf sturgeon)
Acipenser oxyrinchus oxyrinchus Mitchill, 1815 (Atlantic sturgeon)
Acipenser persicus Borodin, 1897 (Persian sturgeon)
Acipenser ruthenus Linnaeus, 1758 (Sterlet, Sterlet sturgeon)
Acipenser schrenckii J. F. Brandt, 1869 (Japanese sturgeon)
Acipenser sinensis J. E. Gray, 1835 (Chinese sturgeon)
Acipenser stellatus Pallas, 1771 (Starry sturgeon)
Acipenser sturio Linnaeus, 1758 (European sea sturgeon)
Acipenser transmontanus J. Richardson, 1836 (White sturgeon)

Fossil species
There are 10 species known from fossil remains:

 †Acipenser albertensis Lambe 1902
 †Acipenser cruciferus (Cope 1876)
†Acipenser eruciferus Cope 1876
Acipenser fulvescens Rafinesque, 1817 (also living)
†Acipenser gigantissimus Nessov 1997
†Acipenser molassicus Probst 1882
†Acipenser ornatus Leidy 1873
Acipenser oxyrinchus Mitchell 1815 (also living)
†Acipenser tuberculosus Probst 1882
 †Acipenser toliapicus Agassiz 1844 ex Woodward 1889

 †Acipenser amnisinferos
 †Acipenser praeparatorum

References

External links

 
Ray-finned fish genera
Extant Campanian first appearances
Taxa named by Carl Linnaeus
Freshwater fish genera